Stenaelurillus jocquei is  a jumping spider species in the genus Stenaelurillus that lives in Cameroon. It was first described in 2018.

References

Arthropods of Cameroon
Spiders described in 2018
Salticidae
Spiders of Africa